Cardia or Kardia, anciently the chief town of the Thracian Chersonese (today Gallipoli peninsula), was situated at the head of the Gulf of Melas (today the Gulf of Saros). It was originally a colony of the Milesians and Clazomenians; but subsequently, in the time of Miltiades (late 6th century BC), the place also received Athenian colonists, as proved by Miltiades tyranny (515–493 BC). But this didn't make Cardia necessarily always pro-Athenian: when in 357 BC Athens took control of the Chersonese, the latter, under the rule of a Thracian prince, was the only city to remain neutral; but the decisive year was 352 BC when the city concluded a treaty of amity with king Philip II of Macedonia. A great crisis exploded when Diopeithes, an Athenian mercenary captain, had in 343 BC brought Attic settlers to the town; and since Cardia was unwilling to receive them, Philip immediately sent help to the town. The king proposed to settle the dispute between the two cities by arbitration, but Athens refused.  Demosthenes, the famous Greek patriot and orator, spoke on this very matter to the Athenian Senate in 341 BC his "Oration On The State Of The Chersonesus":  
Our present concernment is about the affairs of the Chersonesus, and Philip's expedition into Thrace...but most of our orators insist upon the actions and designs of Diopithes...which, if one moment neglected, the loss may be irreparable; here our attention is instantly demanded...shall Philip be left at full liberty to pursue all his other designs, provided he keeps from Attica; and shall not Diopithes be permitted to assist the Thracians? And if he does, shall we accuse him of involving us in a war?...none of you can be weak enough to imagine that Philip's desires are centered in those paltry villages of Thrace...and has no designs on the ports...arsenals...navies...silver mines, and all the other revenues of Athens; but that he will leave them for you to enjoy...? Impossible! No; these and all his expeditions are really intended to facilitate the conquest of Athens....let us shake off our extravagant and dangerous supineness; let us supply the necessary expenses; let us call on our allies...so that, as he hath his force constantly prepared to injure and enslave the Greeks, yours too may be ever ready to protect and assist them.The town was destroyed by Lysimachus about 309 BC, and although it was afterwards rebuilt, it never again rose to any degree of prosperity, as Lysimachia, which was built in its vicinity and peopled with the inhabitants of Cardia, became the chief town in that neighbourhood. Cardia was the birthplace of Alexander's secretary Eumenes and of the historian Hieronymus.

Plutarch in the "Life of Eumenes" writes that the young men and boys of Cardia were exercising in the Pankration and wrestling.

References
Curtius, Ernst; The history of Greece, Adolphus William Ward (translator); New York, (1874)
Smith, William (editor); Dictionary of Greek and Roman Geography, "Cardia", London, (1854)

Notes

Ionian colonies in Thrace
Milesian colonies
Athenian colonies
Former populated places in Turkey
Greek colonies in the Thracian Chersonese
Ancient Greek archaeological sites in Turkey
Populated places in ancient Thrace